Hadi Heidari is a press cartoonist in Tehran, Iran, whose work has appeared in reformist newspapers including Shargh, Norooz and Neshat.
He is 39, and has a degree in painting from Tehran’s Arts and Architecture University. Heidari was imprisoned in 2015 for a cartoon that offended members of the government.

Arrest and imprisonment

Heidari was imprisoned while working at The Shahrvand, a daily newspaper owned by Iran’s Red Crescent Society, the equivalent of the Red Cross. He was sent to Tehran’s Evin Prison to complete a suspended one-year jail sentence imposed in 2013 for his "Blindfold" cartoon, which had been published in the Shargh; leading to a three-month shutdown of that publication.

The Revolutionary Guards had filed a suit against Heidari for his cartoon, which showed a lineup of people, each tying a black blindfold on the next person in line.  The cartoon had no caption, leading to several different interpretations. Several politicians alleged that the cartoon had been intentionally released during the week of Holy Defence (a term referring to the eight-year Iran-Iraq war of the 1980s). According to the politicians, the blindfolds "reflected the black headband worn by Iranian soldiers – and suggested that the soldiers went to war blindly", and that the cartoon offended veterans of that war.

Cartoon responding to Paris terror attacks

At the time of his arrest, Heidari had recently gained international attention with another of his cartoons, which depicted the Eiffel Tower in tearful solidarity with the people of France over the attacks on Paris by Islamic State in 2015. Iran's state news media have blamed France’s policies toward Syria for the attacks, and Heidari's imprisonment occurred shortly after his Paris cartoon appeared.

Release
On 26 April 2016, Heidari announced his release, thanking his supporters and posting an image on Instagram of a dove being freed from its cage.  It was not the first time he had been imprisoned. During 2009, he was also jailed for several weeks during a crackdown following the disputed re-election of then-President Mahmud Ahmadinejad He was imprisoned in 2009 for 17 days.

One commentator suggests that in the Muslim world, political cartoons offer a reliable way to get a point across to people who can't read. The US-based Committee to Protect Journalists rates Iran as the fourth most-censored country in the world, and a number of journalists remain in prison.

References 

Iranian cartoonists
Living people
Year of birth missing (living people)
Islamic Iran Participation Front politicians